Maeve Murphy is a Northern Irish screenwriter and film director.  Her 2002 film Silent Grace was selected to represent the UK for Cannes. In 2011 her short film Sushi, won the Sub-ti short film competition, co judged by Venice Days, Venice Film Festival.  In 2020 the Irish Times listed Maeve Murphy's Silent Grace as no 38 in their 50 Best Irish Films Ever Made. In 2004 Maeve received the Soka Art Award for her work for world peace in the arts.

Early life
She was born in Belfast in Northern Ireland. As a teenager, she was one of the hosts of BBC Northern Ireland's youth TV series Wise Crack. While at Cambridge University, she was the secretary of the Cambridge Footlights and a co-founding member of "Trouble and Strife" theatre company, with which she continued to write and act after graduating. She then worked at Ken Loach's film company Parallax Pictures.

Early work
Murphy's first short Amazing Grace starring Aiden Gillen and Clare Cathcart and was screened at the London Film Festival and the Edinburgh Film Festival before being screened on Channel Four and bought by Film Four. Her second short Salvage, starring Orla Brady, premiered at the Cork Film Festival and was shown on UTV (Northern Ireland) and RTÉ in Éire and was released by the BFI.

Silent Grace, was a prison/hunger strike/women's protest drama starring Orla Brady, Cathleen Bradley, Cara Seymour, Patrick Bergin and Conor Mullen. It was chosen as UK entry for Cannes Film Festival in 2002 but as it had previously screened in the Cannes market in 2001, it could not be considered any further for competition. The film also screened at the Galway, Moscow Film Festival, Taormina and the Hamptons Film Festival, USA, where it was nominated for the Conflict and Resolution Award in association with Nobel Peace Laureates Foundation. The film was positively reviewed by Ronnie Scheib in Variety   and by Michael Dwyer in the Irish Times. Silent Grace was based on a Trouble and Strife play/screenplay written with Murphy called Now and at the Hour of our Death and inspired by Nell McCafferty's The Armagh Women. Tara Brady, of the Dublin Hot Press, said of the film, "Wonderfully humane, Maeve Murphy must be something of a genius, Orla Brady is magnificent."

Silent Grace is a fictional drama based on real events, covering the largely untold story of Republican women prisoners’ involvement in the Dirty Protests and first Hunger Strikes of 1980/1981. Guerilla Films released it via UGC cinemas in London, Belfast and Dublin in 2004, and it was supported by the Irish Film Board. Maeve went on to win the Soka Art Award. Silent Grace achieved 80% rating on Rotten Tomatoes  Silent Grace was picked up for international online streaming on Hulu and Mubi.

On 24 June 2017, 16 years after its film festival premier and following two articles in the Irish Times about women's voices, TV3 gave Silent Grace its Irish nationwide TV première.  
TV3 described it as "compelling viewing." The Sunday Times made it one of the "Films of the Week." The Irish Times said "Silent Grace is important". In May 2020, the Irish Times listed Silent Grace as number 38 in their list of the 50 greatest Irish films of all time. In November 2020 the Foyle Film Festival gave it a special 20th anniversary screening with an online Q&A with Maeve Murphy and Orla Brady. In June 2021, the Irish Film Institute put it on their IFI international online collection. Of note is the support given to the film by Women in Film and TV.

Beyond The Fire, her second feature film, was about love in the wake of sexual assault starring Cara Seymour and Scot Williams. She won Best UK Feature at the London Independent Film Festival 2009 and Best International Feature at the Garden State Film Festival USA 2010. It was selected for the Belfast Film Festival and the ICA New British Cinema season. It was released in the cinema by Met Film Distribution and had a London, Belfast, Dublin cinema release, supported by UKFC in 2009 and 2010. Peter Bradshaw of The Guardian said "its heartfelt, unironic belief in the power of love is attractive." There was press controversy about the film in the Irish Independent regarding RTÉ's decision not to acquire it due to the feeling there was "no appetite for the subject matter". Victims of religious sexual abuse expressed their concern. TV3 then stepped in and it was broadcast across Ireland in April 2010 and May 2010. The organisation One in Four 
supported the film's broadcast. The Daily Mirror made it their "Must See" film.  The Belfast Telegraph said it was "unsettling but brilliant drama". In 2011 Beyond The Fire was sold to the BBC for UK TV transmission by Frank Mannion of Swipe Films. Beyond the Fire was subsequently broadcast on BBC2 on 22 March 2013 and also made available on BBC iPlayer where it was in the 'most popular' section for two weeks. It was one of "Best 8 TV Movies of the Week" in The Sabotage Times and awarded 5 stars on the MyTVGuide listings.

Murphy won the Sub-ti International short film Award 2011 for her comedy drama short Sushi, starring Luanna Priestman and Junichi Kajioka. Venice Days were co judges of that short film award and the win was announced at the Venice Film Festival and in Variety Magazine on 4 September 2011.

Taking Stock, starring Kelly Brook and Scot Williams, an austerity comedy caper feature was based on Sushi. During the shoot and release it garnered coverage in the UK press. Taking Stock was selected for its UK premiere by the 2015 Raindance Film Festival. Taking Stock was selected for the 2015 Monaco International Film Festival where it won 4 awards: Independent Spirit Award: Taking Stock directed by Maeve Murphy; Best Supporting Actor; Best Producer; Best Cinematography. Taking Stock showed at the 2016 Garden State Film Festival where the film and director Maeve Murphy and producer Geoff Austin won the Bud Abbott Award for feature-length comedy. The film also showed at the WIND International Film Festival in LA where Maeve won the award for best female director in the comedy section. Also, Junichi Kajioka won the award for best supporting actor. Indiewire said "Maeve Murphy is a name to look out for". Mark Kermode of the Observer said of Maeve that she was a "Talented writer/director" and the Huffington Post reviewed the film very positively, saying "beautifully directed with attractive performances". Taking Stock was released by Independent Distributor Swipe Films in cinemas across the UK on 5 Feb 2016 and was bought and released by Netflix and was featured in the 'Popular on Netflix' section. It was also selected 'Staff Pick' for popular independent films on Google Play.
Taking Stock selected for Russia's 2016 Sochi International Film Festival and the SIFA Presidents Award was won by Director Maeve Murphy.

Recent work
Siobhan was a ghost/rape-revenge 2017 short film written and directed by Maeve Murphy. It won the award of excellence in the One Reeler Short film competition in LA  and the award for Best Music which was composed by David Long. It screened at the Kerry, Foyle, Garden State and Sochi International Film Festivals where Maeve as Director won The Presidents Award for it. It was selected for the WFT Ireland shorts screening at the IFI 2018. Film Critic Rich Cline in Shadows on The Wall said  it was "beautifully shot...its darkly moving. And also eerily provocative."

Murphy made "Global Network for Peace", a short documentary commissioned by the SGI, a Buddhist organisation of which she is a member, about the impact of Hiroshima and advancing peace. An excerpt was broadcast on BBC World News on March 16, 2018. It had a work in progress screening for Generation Hope an SGI-UK youth peace event. It was then completed to include the Treaty on the Prohibition of Nuclear Weapons becoming law in January 2021 and premiered at the Foyle Intercultural anti-racist film festival April 3, 2021

During 2018-2020 Maeve wrote a feature film screenplay with Victoria Mary Clarke about the life/love story of Victoria and Shane MacGowan.

Maeve Murphy wrote 'Christmas at the Cross', a short story which was published in the Irish Times on Christmas Eve 2019 and reached No. 3 in their Culture Top 10 Most Read. It was also published in paperback in "Nativity" annual short story anthology by Bridge House press.
On the 26th of December 2020 the Irish Times published 'The Little Statue', which is part 2 of the 'Christmas at the Cross' story. It is a novella in 4 parts about a young Irish woman holed up in a red light area of London who becomes friends with a local prostitute,  as the area erupts in a heroic rage. It was published by Bridge House Publishing in October 2021. It was critically acclaimed by the Irish Times, the Irish Examiner and the Daily Mail Ireland. Maeve figured in the publicity and did a number of interviews focussing on her time living in Kings Cross, most notably The Sunday Independent two page interview with Maeve with best selling author Emily Hourican was number 3 Most read. Film maker Jim Sheridan said "This is a book about women who have had enough...you will be astonished by Maeve's riveting tale." The film adaptation is being done with Tile Media where Maeve is to write and direct with support from Screen Ireland.

References

External links 

Living people
20th-century people from Northern Ireland
21st-century people from Northern Ireland
Year of birth missing (living people)
Mass media people from Belfast
Alumni of the University of Cambridge
British women screenwriters
British women film directors
Screenwriters from Northern Ireland
Television writers from Northern Ireland
Film directors from Northern Ireland
Television directors from Northern Ireland
Screenwriting instructors
Irish women film directors
British women television writers
British women television directors